is a biography series produced by Tsuburaya Productions. Featuring Booska and Alien Pegassa Pega, they navigate the viewers to  media of Ultra Series, ranging from Ultraman Ginga up to Ultraman R/B.

Episodes

Cast
: 
: 
: 
: 
: 
: 
: 
: 
: 
: 
: 
:

Voice actors
: 
: 
: 
Narration:

Theme song
"Hope the youth"
Lyrics & Composition: 
Arrangement: Bentham, PRIMAGIC
Artist: Bentham
Episodes: 1-13 (Verse 1); 14-26 (Verse 2)

References

External links
Ultraman New Generation Chronicle at TV Tokyo 

2019 Japanese television series debuts
2019 Japanese television series endings
TV Tokyo original programming
Ultra television series